Iron pillar may refer to:

 Iron pillar of Delhi, about 23 feet high
 Iron pillar of Dhar, now-fragmented, originally over 43 feet high
 Iron pillar of Kodachadri, about 40 feet high

See also 
 Iron
 Iron (disambiguation)
 Pillar (disambiguation)
 Piller (disambiguation)
 Weathering steel